Blakea pascoensis is a species of plant in the family Melastomataceae. It is endemic to Peru.

References

pascoensis
Endemic flora of Peru
Taxonomy articles created by Polbot
Vulnerable plants
Taxobox binomials not recognized by IUCN